The 2020 Copa Libertadores group stage was played from 3 March to 22 October 2020. A total of 32 teams competed in the group stage to decide the 16 places in the final stages of the 2020 Copa Libertadores.

Draw
The draw for the group stage was held on 17 December 2019, 20:30 PYST (UTC−3), at the CONMEBOL Convention Centre in Luque, Paraguay.

Teams were seeded by their CONMEBOL ranking of the Copa Libertadores as of 15 December 2019 (shown in parentheses), taking into account the following three factors:
Performance in the last 10 years, taking into account Copa Libertadores results in the period 2010–2019
Historical coefficient, taking into account Copa Libertadores results in the period 1960–2009
Local tournament champion, with bonus points awarded to domestic league champions of the last 10 years
For the group stage, the 32 teams were drawn into eight groups (Groups A–H) of four containing a team from each of the four pots. Teams from the same association could not be drawn into the same group, excluding the four winners of the third stage, which were allocated to Pot 4 and whose identity was not known at the time of the draw, and could be drawn into the same group with another team from the same association.

Notes

The following were the four winners of the third stage of qualifying which joined the 28 direct entrants in the group stage.

Format

In the group stage, each group was played on a home-and-away round-robin basis. The teams were ranked according to the following criteria: 1. Points (3 points for a win, 1 point for a draw, and 0 points for a loss); 2. Goal difference; 3. Goals scored; 4. Away goals scored; 5. CONMEBOL ranking (Regulations Article 2.4.2).

The winners and runners-up of each group advanced to the round of 16 of the final stages. The third-placed teams of each group entered the Copa Sudamericana second stage.

Schedule
The schedule of each matchday was as follows (Regulations Article 2.2.2).

On 12 March 2020, CONMEBOL announced that the tournament would be temporarily suspended after matchday 2 due to the COVID-19 pandemic, with matches on matchday 3, originally scheduled for 17–19 March 2020, postponed to a later date to be confirmed. On 18 March 2020, CONMEBOL announced that the tournament would be suspended until 5 May 2020. On 17 April 2020, CONMEBOL announced that the tournament would be suspended indefinitely, and no date had been set for its resumption. On 10 July 2020, CONMEBOL announced the new schedule for the remainder of the competition, with the fixtures being confirmed on 20 July 2020, and the updated fixtures announced on 26 August 2020.

Groups

Group A

Group B

Group C

Group D

Group E

Group F

Group G

Group H

Notes

References

External links
CONMEBOL Libertadores 2020, CONMEBOL.com

2
March 2020 sports events in South America
September 2020 sports events in South America
October 2020 sports events in South America